The Leader of the Opposition in the Senate is a party office held by the Opposition's most senior member of the Shadow Cabinet in the Australian Senate, elected to lead the opposition party (or parties) in the body. Though the leader in the Senate does not have the power of the office of Leader of the Opposition (i.e. the leader in the House of Representatives and overall party leader), there are some parallels between the latter's status in the lower house and the former's in the Senate. In addition to his or her own shadow ministerial portfolio, the leader has overarching responsibility for all policy areas and acts as the opposition's principal spokesperson in the upper house. The leader is entitled to sit at the table of the Senate, and has priority in gaining recognition from the President of the Senate to speak in debate. Another similarity is that the leader typically announces changes to opposition officeholders in the Senate, including shadow ministers, party leadership and whips. The leader also has some responsibility for appointing opposition senators to committees, a role filled by the Manager of Opposition Business and whips in the lower house. The current leader is Simon Birmingham. He is assisted by a Deputy Leader of the Opposition in the Senate, currently Michaelia Cash.

List of leaders of the opposition in the Senate

See also
 Leader of the Government in the Senate (Australia)
 Manager of Opposition Business in the Senate

Notes

References

Lists of Australian politicians
Lists of political office-holders in Australia
Members of the Australian Senate
Opposition of Australia
Australia